The Painted Angel (also known as The Broadway Hostess) is a 1929 black and white American film. The storyline is based on a story by Fannie Hurst, "Give This Little Girl a Hand" The film is known as La favorita di Broadway in Italy. The tagline was: Do you want to know the Truth about NIGHT CLUB HOSTESSES?

This film is believed lost. The UCLA Film and Television Archive only hold seven of the original eight sound discs for the film: Vitaphone production reels #3629-3635 and 3643. In a separately filmed trailer, Billie Dove talks to the audience about the picture. In September 1928, Warner Bros. Pictures purchased a majority interest in First National Pictures and from that point on, all "First National" productions were actually made under Warner Bros. control, even though the two companies continued to retain separate identities until the mid-1930s, after which time "A Warner Bros.-First National Picture" was often used.  The film reel was 1972 m (7 reels) in length.

Cast
Billie Dove - Mamie Hudler / Rodeo West
Edmund Lowe - Brood
George MacFarlane - Oldfield
Cissy Fitzgerald - Ma Hudler
J. Farrell MacDonald - Pa Hudler
Norman Selby - Jule
Nellie Bly Baker - Sippie  (*this actress is not Nellie Bly (Baker) of 1889 around the world fame who died in 1922)
Will Stanton - Joe
Douglas Gerrard - Sir Harry
Shep Camp - Mac
Peter Higgins - Singer
Red Stanley - Dancer

Soundtrack
Help Yourself To Love
Music by M.K. Jerome
Lyrics by Herman Ruby
Bride Without A Groom
Music by M.K. Jerome
Lyrics by Herman Ruby
Only The Girl
Music by M.K. Jerome
Lyrics by Herman Ruby
Everybody's Darling
Music by M.K. Jerome
Lyrics by Herman Ruby
That Thing
Music by M.K. Jerome
Lyrics by Herman Ruby

References

External links

The Painted Angel at tcm.com
The Painted Angel (1929) New York Times profile
Image of the production of The Painted Angel, 1929
The Painted Angel profile Filmval.se

1929 films
1929 musical films
Lost American films
American black-and-white films
American musical films
Films based on works by Fannie Hurst
1929 lost films
Films directed by Millard Webb
1920s American films